FC Mosenergo Moscow was a Russian football team from Moscow. It played professionally from 1992 to 2003. Their best result was 4th place in the Zone West of the Russian Second Division in 1998 and 2001.

External links
  Team history at KLISF

Association football clubs established in 1980
Association football clubs disestablished in 2004
Defunct football clubs in Moscow
1980 establishments in Russia
2004 disestablishments in Russia